Marzullo is a family name of Italian origin. Notable people with the name include:
 Frank Marzullo, American meteorologist
 Gianluca Marzullo, Italian-German footballer 
 Gigi Marzullo, Italian journalist
 Keith Marzullo, American computer scientist

See also 
 Marzullo's algorithm

Italian-language surnames